Spain, represented by the Spanish Olympic Committee (COE), competed at the 2016 Summer Olympics in Rio de Janeiro, Brazil, from 5 to 21 August 2016. Since the nation's official debut in 1920, Spanish athletes have appeared in every edition of the Summer Olympic Games except for two; the 1936 Summer Olympics in Nazi Germany, and the 1956 Summer Olympics in Melbourne, as a protest against the Soviet invasion of Hungary. The Spanish Olympic Committee sent a total of 306 athletes, 163 men and 143 women, to compete in 25 sports.

Medalists

|  style="text-align:left; width:78%; vertical-align:top;"|

Competitors

|  style="text-align:left; width:78%; vertical-align:top;"|
The following is the list of number of competitors participating in the Games. Note that reserves in fencing, field hockey, football, and handball are not counted as athletes:

Archery

Three Spanish archers qualified for the men's events after having secured a top eight finish in the team recurve at the 2015 World Archery Championships in Copenhagen, Denmark. Meanwhile, one Spanish archer was added to the squad by virtue of a top six national finish in the women's individual recurve at the 2016 Archery World Cup meet in Antalya, Turkey.

Athletics

Spanish athletes have so far achieved qualifying standards in the following athletics events (up to a maximum of 3 athletes in each event): In the last quarter of 2015, four Spanish track and field athletes have been selected to the Olympic team by the Spanish Athletics Federation based on their outstanding performances at the IAAF World Championships.

Track & road events
Men

Women

Field events
Men

Women

Combined events – Men's decathlon

Badminton

Spain qualified two badminton players for each of the following events into the Olympic tournament. Two-time Olympian Pablo Abián and world no. 1 seed Carolina Marín were selected among the top 34 individual shuttlers each in the men's and women's singles based on the BWF World Rankings as of 5 May 2016.

Basketball

Men's tournament

Spain men's basketball team qualified for the Olympics by attaining a top two finish towards the final match of the EuroBasket 2015 in France.

Team roster

Group play

Quarterfinal

Semifinal

Bronze medal game

Women's tournament

Spain women's basketball team qualified for the Olympics with a quarterfinal victory at the 2016 FIBA World Olympic Qualifying Tournament in Nantes, France.

Team roster

Group play

Quarterfinal

Semifinal

Final

Boxing

Spain entered one boxer to compete in the men's light flyweight division into the Olympic boxing tournament. Samuel Carmona had claimed an Olympic spot with his semifinal victory at the 2016 AIBA World Qualifying Tournament in Baku, Azerbaijan. Meanwhile, Youba Sissokho rounded out the Spanish roster with his box-off victory at the 2016 APB and WSB Olympic Qualifier in Vargas, Venezuela.

Canoeing

Slalom
Spanish canoeists have qualified two boats in each of the following through the 2015 ICF Canoe Slalom World Championships, and the 2016 European Canoe Slalom Championships, respectively.

Sprint
Spanish canoeists have qualified two boats in each of the following distances for the Games through the 2015 ICF Canoe Sprint World Championships. Meanwhile, four additional boats (men's C-1 200 m, men's K-1 1000 m, and men's K-1 & K-2 200 m) were awarded to the Spanish squad by virtue of a top two national finish at the 2016 European Qualification Regatta in Duisburg, Germany.

Men

Women

Qualification Legend: FA = Qualify to final (medal); FB = Qualify to final B (non-medal)

Cycling

Road
Spanish riders qualified for the following quota places in the men's and women's Olympic road race by virtue of their top 15 final national ranking in the 2015 UCI World Tour (for men) and top 22 in the UCI World Ranking (for women).

Men

Women

Track
Following the completion of the 2016 UCI Track Cycling World Championships, Spain secured a berth in the women's team sprint with a right to enter two riders in the women's sprint and keirin. Although Spain failed to earn a place in the men's team sprint, they managed to secure a single berth in the men's sprint, by virtue of their final individual UCI Olympic ranking in that event.

Sprint

Team sprint

Keirin

Mountain biking
Spanish mountain bikers qualified for three men's quota places into the Olympic cross-country race, as a result of the nation's third-place finish in the UCI Olympic Ranking List of 25 May 2016.

Equestrian

Spanish equestrians have qualified a full squad each in the team dressage and jumping competition through the 2015 European Championships. One eventing rider has been added to the squad by virtue of a top nine finish from overall Olympic rankings. Spain is scheduled to mark its Olympic comeback in eventing and jumping for the first time since 2000.

Dressage

Eventing

Jumping

"#" indicates that the score of this rider does not count in the team competition, since only the best three results of a team are counted.

Field hockey

Summary

Men's tournament

Spain men's field hockey team qualified for the Olympics by having achieved the next highest placement in the 2014-2015 FIH Hockey World League Semifinals among the countries that have not qualified yet for the Games.

Team roster

Group play

Quarterfinal

Women's tournament

Spain women's field hockey team qualified for the Olympics by having achieved the next highest placement in the 2014-2015 FIH Hockey World League Semifinals among the countries that have not qualified yet for the Games.

Team roster

Group play

Quarterfinal

Golf 

Spain entered four golfers (two per gender) into the Olympic tournament. Rafa Cabrera-Bello (world no. 28), Sergio García  (world no. 12), Carlota Ciganda (world no. 36) and Azahara Muñoz (world no. 48) qualified directly among the top 60 eligible players for their respective individual events based on the IGF World Rankings as of 11 July 2016.

Gymnastics

Artistic
Spain entered three artistic gymnasts into the Olympic competition, failing to send both men's and women's all-around teams for the first time since 1980. Rayderley Zapata had claimed his Olympic spot in the men's apparatus and all-around events at the 2015 World Championships, while two more places had been awarded each to the Spanish male and female gymnast, who participated at the Olympic Test Event in Rio de Janeiro.

Men

Women

Rhythmic 
Spain qualified a squad of rhythmic gymnasts for the individual and group all-around by finishing in the top 15 (for individual) and top 10 (for group) at the 2015 World Championships in Stuttgart, Germany.

Handball

Summary

Women's tournament

Spain women's handball team qualified for the Olympics by having achieved the next highest placement at the 2014 European Championships, as the winning team Norway had guaranteed their rights to secure a lone outright berth for the Games through the 2015 World Championships.

Team roster

Group play

Quarterfinal

Judo

Spain qualified a total of five judokas for the following weight classes at the Games. Francisco Garrigos, Julia Figueroa, María Bernabéu, and London 2012 Olympian Sugoi Uriarte were ranked among the top 22 eligible judokas for men and top 14 for women in the IJF World Ranking List of 30 May 2016, while Laura Gómez at women's half-lightweight (52 kg) earned a continental quota spot from the European region, as the highest-ranked Spanish judoka outside of direct qualifying position.

Rowing

Spain qualified two boats for each of the following rowing classes into the Olympic regatta. One rowing crew had confirmed an Olympic place for their boat in the men's pair at the 2015 FISA World Championships in Lac d'Aiguebelette, France, while the women's pair rowers had added one more boat to the Spanish roster as a result of their top four finish at the 2016 European & Final Qualification Regatta in Lucerne, Switzerland.

Qualification Legend: FA=Final A (medal); FB=Final B (non-medal); FC=Final C (non-medal); FD=Final D (non-medal); FE=Final E (non-medal); FF=Final F (non-medal); SA/B=Semifinals A/B; SC/D=Semifinals C/D; SE/F=Semifinals E/F; QF=Quarterfinals; R=Repechage

Rugby sevens

Men's tournament

Spain men's rugby sevens team qualified for the Olympics by winning the final Cup match over Samoa at the Final Olympic Qualification Tournament in Fontvieille, Monaco.

Team roster

Group play

Classification semifinal (9–12)

Ninth place match

Women's tournament

Spain women's rugby sevens team qualified for the Olympics by winning the final Cup match over Russia at the Final Olympic Qualification Tournament in Dublin, Ireland.

Team roster

Group play

Quarterfinals

Classification semifinal (5–8)

Seventh place match

Sailing

Spanish sailors have qualified one boat in each of the following classes through the 2014 ISAF Sailing World Championships, the individual fleet Worlds, and European qualifying regattas.

In December 2015, the Royal Spanish Sailing Federation had announced the first four sailors to compete at the Rio regatta: four-time Olympian Iván Pastor, 2012 Olympic champions Marina Alabau in women's RS:X and Támara Echegoyen in the inaugural 49erFX, along with her partner and former 470 crew Berta Betanzos. Laser sailor Joaquín Blanco, along with the 470 and Nacra 17 crews, had claimed their Olympic spots at the ISAF World Cup meet in Hyères, France, while skiff duo Diego Botín and Iago López rounded out the Spanish roster at the Delta Lloyd Regatta on 27 May 2016, following a selection controversy.

Laser Radial sailor and London 2012 Olympian Alicia Cebrián was the last Spaniard to join the sailing crew for the Games at the Kiel Week Regatta in Germany on 24 June 2016.

Men

Women

Mixed

M = Medal race; EL = Eliminated – did not advance into the medal race

Shooting

Spanish shooters have achieved quota places for the following events by virtue of their best finishes at the 2014 and 2015 ISSF World Championships, the 2015 ISSF World Cup series, and European Championships or Games, as long as they obtained a minimum qualifying score (MQS) by 31 March 2016. The shooting team was named at the conclusion of the European Airgun Championships on 1 March 2016, including London 2012 fifth-place finalist Fátima Gálvez and two-time Olympians Alberto Fernández and Sonia Franquet.

Qualification Legend: Q = Qualify for the next round; q = Qualify for the bronze medal (shotgun)

Swimming

Spanish swimmers have so far achieved qualifying standards in the following events (up to a maximum of 2 swimmers in each event at the Olympic Qualifying Time (OQT), and potentially 1 at the Olympic Selection Time (OST): To assure their selection to the Olympic team, swimmers must attain a top-two finish in the final (or in heat-declared winner races on time for long-distance freestyle) inside the federation's target standards at the Spanish Open in Sabadell (19 to 22 March) and the 2016 European Championships in London (16 to 22 May).

A total of 12 Spanish swimmers, highlighted by 2012 double Olympic silver medalist Mireia Belmonte, were formally announced at the Spanish Open on 31 March 2016, while the others were added to the team on 16 June, which extended the swimming roster size to almost a double.

Men

Women

Synchronized swimming

Spain fielded a squad of two synchronized swimmers to compete only in the women's duet by virtue of their first-place finish at the FINA Olympic test event in Rio de Janeiro.

Table tennis

Spain entered three athletes into the table tennis competition at the Games. Remarkably going to her third Olympics, Shen Yanfei was automatically selected among the top 22 eligible players in the women's singles based on the ITTF Olympic Rankings. Meanwhile, He Zhiwen granted an invitation from ITTF to compete in the men's singles as one of the next seven highest-ranked eligible players, not yet qualified, on the Olympic Ranking List.

With France's Carole Grundisch pulling out from the Games because of her shoulder injury, two-time Olympian Galia Dvorak took over the vacant spot to join Shen in the women's singles.

Taekwondo

Spain entered three athletes into the taekwondo competition at the Olympics. 2012 Olympic flyweight champion Joel González and two-time Worlds medalist Eva Calvo qualified automatically for their respective weight classes by finishing in the top 6 WTF Olympic rankings. 2015 European Games silver medalist Jesús Tortosa secured a third spot on the Spanish team by virtue of his top two finish in the men's flyweight category (58 kg) at the 2016 European Qualification Tournament in Istanbul.

Tennis

Spain entered nine tennis players (five men and four women) into the Olympic tournament. Beijing 2008 champion Rafael Nadal (world no. 4), along with his colleagues David Ferrer (world no. 14), Roberto Bautista Agut (world no. 16), and Albert Ramos (world no. 32), qualified directly for the men's singles as four of the top 56 eligible players in the ATP World Rankings, while two-time Olympian Carla Suárez Navarro and French Open champion Garbiñe Muguruza did so for the women's singles based on their WTA World Rankings as of 6 June 2016.

Having been directly entered to the singles, Nadal also opted to play with London 2012 Olympian Marc López in the men's doubles. Meanwhile, Anabel Medina Garrigues and Arantxa Parra Santonja paired up together for the second straight time in the women's doubles. On 12 August, Rafael Nadal along with Marc Lopez won the gold medal in men's doubles event for Spain beating Romania's Florin Mergea and Horia Tecau.

Men

Women

Mixed

Triathlon

Spain qualified a total of six triathletes for the Olympics. London 2012 silver medalist Javier Gómez Noya secured the men's triathlon spot for the Spaniards with a gold medal triumph at the ITU World Qualification Event in Rio de Janeiro. Meanwhile, Fernando Alarza, Mario Mola, Miriam Casillas, Ainhoa Murúa, and Carolina Routier were ranked among the top 40 eligible triathletes each in the men's and women's event, respectively, based on the ITU Olympic Qualification List as of 15 May 2016.

On 14 July 2016, Gómez pulled out of the Games due to his elbow injury in a cycling accident. As the next highest-ranked Spanish triathlete, not yet qualified, on the list, Vicente Hernández took over his place.

Volleyball

Beach
Spain men's and women's beach volleyball teams qualified directly for the Olympics by virtue of their nation's top 15 placement in the FIVB Olympic Rankings as of 13 June 2016. These places were awarded to three-time Olympian Pablo Herrera, along with returnees Adrián Gavira and female duo Elsa Baquerizo and Liliana Fernández from London 2012.

Water polo

Summary

Men's tournament

Spain men's water polo team qualified for the Olympics by virtue of a top four finish at the Olympic Qualification Tournament in Trieste.

Team roster

Group play

Quarterfinal

Classification semifinal (5–8)

Seventh place match

Women's tournament

Spain women's water polo team qualified for the Olympics by virtue of a top four finish at the Olympic Qualification Tournament in Gouda.

Team roster

Group play

Quarterfinal

Classification semifinal (5–8)

Fifth place match

Weightlifting

Spanish weightlifters have qualified three men's places for the Rio Olympics based on their combined team standing by points at the 2014 and 2015 IWF World Championships. A single women's Olympic spot had been added to the Spanish roster by virtue of a top six national finish at the 2016 European Championships. The team must allocate these places to individual athletes by 20 June 2016.

The weightlifting team was named to the Olympic roster on 7 June 2016, with Lydia Valentín going to her third straight Olympics.

Wrestling

Spain qualified one wrestler for the men's freestyle 74 kg into the Olympic competition, as a result of his semifinal triumph at the final meet of the World Qualification Tournament in Istanbul.

Men's freestyle

See also
Spain at the 2016 Summer Paralympics

References

External links 

 

Olympics
Nations at the 2016 Summer Olympics
2016